The International Certification Accreditation Council (ICAC) is an alliance of organizations dedicated to assuring competency, professional management, and service to the public by encouraging and setting standards for licensing, certification, and credentialing programs.

Background
In 1996, a group of association executives chartered the ICAC as a not-for-profit organization with the purpose of evaluating certification programs at an affordable rate that smaller organizations can afford.  In order to accomplish this mission, the organization requires a substantial commitment of volunteer time from accredited associations, keeping administrative overhead to a minimum.

Over the years the ICAC has also developed a comprehensive process to evaluate certification programs against international standards designed not only to confirm the association is complying with industry norms, but also help correct any minor administrative concerns uncovered during the evaluation.  In this way, accredited organizations can both improve existing certification programs as well as demonstrate to the public that their programs comply with industry best practices.

By accrediting certification programs, the public and the industries represented have an additional level of assurance, knowing that the program has been reviewed by a neutral third party and been found to meet or exceed reasonable levels of record keeping, security, objectivity, and professionalism.

Guidelines
The ICAC itself operates under the international guidelines established as a quality assurance regime for accreditation bodies (ISO/IEC 17011 – Conformity Assessment:  General Requirements for Accreditation Bodies Accrediting Conformity Assessment Bodies),  and has established assessment tools and processes that assure certification bodies are in compliance with ISO/IEC 17024 (2012):  Conformity Assessment – General Requirements for Bodies Operating Certification of Persons.

Accredited programs
To date, ICAC has reviewed and accredited nearly 100 certification programs, including those listed below.

Electronics Technicians Association, International (ETA International) Programs
 Over 80 accredited certifications in: 
 Basic Electronics
 Biomedical
 Communications
 Fiber Optics & Data Cabling
 Information Technology
 Photonics & Precision Optics
 Renewable Energy
 Smart Home
 Workforce Readiness

National Association of Radio & Telecommunications Engineers, Inc. (NARTE) Programs

Telecommunications Electrostatic Discharge Control (ESD)
 ESD ENGINEER Certification
 ESD TECHNICIAN Certification
 Electromagnetic Compatibility
 EMC ENGINEER Certification
 EMC TECHNICIAN Certification

SpaceTEC Programs
 SpaceTEC Certified Aerospace Technician Core Certification
 SpaceTEC Vehicle Processing Certification
 SpaceTEC Manufacturing Certification
 SpaceTEC Composites Certification
 CertTEC Basic Composites Certification
 CertTEC Basic Electricity & Electronics Certification

Members
Members of the ICAC board of directors and its various committees are volunteers who draw from many years of experience in managing not-for-profit organizations.

References

External links
 International Certification Accreditation Council official Website
 Electronic Technicians Association
 SpaceTEC website

Accreditation